Carthy is a surname, and may refer to:

 Brian Carthy, Gaelic games correspondent and commentator
 Deborah Carthy-Deu (born 1966), Puerto Rican actress
 Eliza Carthy (born 1975), English folk musician
 John Carthy (1972–2000), Irish citizen who was shot dead by the Garda Emergency Response Unit
 John Dennis Carthy (1923–1972), British zoologist
 Martin Carthy (born 1941), English folk musician

See also
 Carty (name), for derivation
 McCarthy (disambiguation)